Ambabbo is a village in eastern Djibouti. It is located in the region of Tadjoura.

History
The missionaries Carl Wilhelm Isenberg, and Johann Ludwig Krapf spent a night at Ambabbo (which they called "Anbabo") in 1839, describing it as a resting-place, "where the caravans usually halt" on the shore of the bay Ghubbat-el Kharab. Charles Johnston, passing through this settlement about three years later, described it as "a small native village of about eight houses".

Location
Nearby towns and villages include Airolaf (9.6 nm), Bankouale (9.3 nm), Oue`a (8.3 nm), Tadjoura (4.6 nm) and `Arta (13.8 nm).

References

External links
Satellite map at Maplandia.com

Populated places in Djibouti
Tadjourah Region